Orthogonius kubani is a species of ground beetle in the subfamily Orthogoniinae. It was described by Ming-Yi Tian and Thierry Deuve in 2006.

References

kubani
Beetles described in 2006